Andre Smith may refer to:

Sports

American football
Andre Smith (offensive tackle) (born 1987), American football offensive tackle
Andre Smith (tight end) (born 1988), American football tight end
Andre Smith (linebacker) (born 1997), American football linebacker

Basketball
Andre Smith (basketball, born 1958), American college basketball player for the Nebraska Cornhuskers
Andre Smith (basketball, born 1985), American expatriate professional basketball

Others
J. Andre Smith (1880–1959), American war artist

See also
Andrew Smith (disambiguation)